Alexander "AJ" Brimson (born 9 September 1998) is an Australian rugby league footballer who plays as a  and  for the Gold Coast Titans in the National Rugby League (NRL). 

He has played for Queensland in the State of Origin series and Australia 9s at international level. He made his debut in the NRL in 2018.

Background
Brimson was born in Brisbane, Queensland, Australia and attended high school on the Gold Coast at famous Rugby League school  Keebra Park State High before signing with the Gold Coast Titans.

He played his junior rugby league at Centenary Panthers. Brimson played predominantly touch football growing up making many rep teams. Brimson didn't make a Rugby League rep side until under 16's.

He was an apprentice carpenter before he played his NRL debut in 2018.

2018
Brimson made his NRL debut for the Gold Coast at five-eighth in round 10 of the 2018 NRL season against the Melbourne Storm. In round 11 of the 2018 NRL season against the Newcastle Knights, Brimson scored his first NRL try in the Gold Coast's 33–26 win at Robina Stadium.  Brimson made a total of 15 appearances for the Gold Coast in 2018 as the club finished 14th on the table.

2019
Brimson made a total of 21 appearances and scored 4 tries for the Gold Coast in the 2019 NRL season as the club endured a horror year on and off the field.  During the halfway mark of the season, head coach Garth Brennan was sacked by the club after a string of poor results.  The Gold Coast managed to win only 4 games for the entire season and finished last claiming the Wooden Spoon. On 7 October, Brimson earned his first representative jersey as he was named for the Australian side in the 2019 Rugby League World Cup 9s. Later that day, Brimson was named on the bench for the U23 Junior Australian side.

2020
Brimson had an injury plagued 2020, where he had suffered a stress fracture in his back during pre-season, which then developed into a full blown broken back, putting him out for half of the season. He played nine games scoring seven tries in 2020, leading the Gold Coast to five straight wins to end the season, where his form granted him a spot in the Queensland Origin team.

On 4 November 2020, Brimson made his State of Origin debut at the Adelaide Oval, scoring a try in Queensland's 18–14 win in game 1 of the series. Despite being able to play out the game, Brimson suffered a foot injury in game 1, making him unavailable for the remainder of the series.

2021
On 17 August, Brimson was ruled out for an indefinite period after suffering a hairline fracture to his jaw in the Gold Coast's round 22 loss against South Sydney.

2022
In round 24 of the 2022 NRL season, Brimson scored two tries for the Gold Coast in their 36-26 victory against Newcastle.  The win ensured that the Gold Coast would avoid the wooden spoon.
Brimson played a total of 22 matches throughout the year as the club finished 13th on the table.

References

External links
Titans profile

1998 births
Living people
Australian rugby league players
Gold Coast Titans players
Queensland Rugby League State of Origin players
Rugby league five-eighths
Rugby league players from Brisbane
Rugby league fullbacks